Rustavi 2 ("Rustavi ori") is a Georgian free-to-air television channel based in Tbilisi, that was founded in 1994 in the town of Rustavi (hence its name).

It is an associate member of the European Broadcasting Union. Its news service has bureaus and regional reporters in major Georgian cities (Kutaisi, Batumi, Gori, Poti, Zugdidi), as well as the permanent correspondents in Washington D.C., Brussels and Moscow. The independence of the channel was questioned in recent years, with many suggesting that it was biased in favor of the former ruling party UNM.

History
It was formed in 1994 and had been in a strong opposition to Eduard Shevardnadze’s government since then. The channel shut down due to allegedly losing its license a year later. The Georgian authorities made several attempts to shut R2 down. Giorgi Sanaia, Georgia’s most popular TV journalist, who worked for R2, was murdered in July 2001. It has been considered by many as a political murder related with his programme "Night Courier" and investigations of allegations of official corruption. In October 2001, the security police raid on R2 office resulted in public anger and subsequent mass street demonstrations against the government's pressure on independent media forced Eduard Shevardnadze to fire his entire cabinet. By 15 March 2003, to coincide with the launch of its sister channel Imedi TV, Rustavi 2 introduced a new logo which consists of a zig-zagged abstract 2-numeral that is coloured bronze and are made up of gradient effects. Rustavi 2 was the main mass media source used as a tribune by the opposition leaders during the Rose Revolution in November 2003. On 25 December 2009, to celebrate its 15th anniversary, Rustavi 2 adopted a new logo during its Christmas special.

On December 14, 2012, Nika Gvaramia was appointed as the general director of the channel. On July 18, 2019, he was replaced by Paata Salia, who is the lawyer of Kibar Khalvashi, current owner of the channel.

Logos

Programming

Kurieri (Courier)
The news program Courier has aired since the foundation of Rustavi 2 and has become one of the most successful news programs in Georgia.

The daytime news was anchored by Ana Kinkladze, Keti Kvachantiradze and Natia Goksadze.
Diana Jojua and Zaal Udumashvili anchor the evening news at 18:00 and 21:00, including sports with Dimitri Oboladze. David Kikalishvili presents "P.S." every Sunday at 21:00.

Business Courier
From 2006 new television season Rustavi 2 airs Business Courier. The program offers in-depth reporting and critical analysis of major business issues today with an emphasis on current events, business development, market outlooks, and emerging opportunities.

P.S.
P.S. is a weekly analytical and educational summarizing program, which focuses on politics, economics and social problems; the project also covers topical cultural issues. P.S. often reports on various international events related to Georgia. Program is anchored by Giorgi Gabunia.

Ownership

Rustavi 2 was originally owned by Erosi Kitsmarishvili, David Dvali, Jarji Akimidze and Nika Tabatadze. In July 2004, 90% of the company's shares was bought by the Batumi-based businessman Kibar Khalvashi, who was forced by then president Mikheil Saakashvili to sell the company, in January 2006, to David Bezhuashvili, member of the Parliament of Georgia and brother of Georgia's Foreign Minister Gela Bezhuashvili. In mid-2006 Rustavi 2, the television company Mze TV and radio station Pirveli Stereo merged into a holding which is currently owned by the Georgian Industrial Group (GIG) and GeoMedia Group. GIG, which owns a 45% share of both stations, is a large company with diversified business interests ranging from coal mining and energy to travel. Davit Bezhuashvili, is a founding member of the group. The GeoMedia group is a relatively obscure company registered in the Marshall Islands.

On 2 March 2017, the Supreme Court of Georgia declared that the owners of the company were Kibar Khalvashi (60% shares) and Panorama Ltd. (40% shares). On March 3, the company submitted an appeal to the European Court of Human Rights, which, in its turn, on 4 March 2017 suspended the Supreme Court decision until 8 March and requested additional documentation. On July 18, 2019, the European Court of Human Rights found no violation by the Georgian courts in the Rustavi 2 case which lifted the suspension mechanism, thus returning the company back to its owner, Kibar Khalvashi.

Perception of Bias
From February 2012 - August 2014, the National Democratic Institute conducted polls which included a question about which media organizations represented the interest of which political factions. A plurality of respondents in each case believed that Rustavi 2 represented the United National Movement (or, in the case of the February 2012 poll, the government, which was at the time controlled by the UNM). The results of the polls which asked this question is summarized below.

References

External links
 Rustavi 2 official website
 Rustavi 2 Live

Television stations in Georgia (country)
Mass media in Rustavi
Mass media in Tbilisi
Mass media companies of Georgia (country)
Companies based in Tbilisi
Television channels and stations established in 1994
Mass media companies established in 1994
1994 establishments in Georgia (country)
Georgian-language television stations